is a Japanese professional shogi player ranked 7-dan. He is a former executive director of the Japan Shogi Association.

Early life
Katagami was born in Hiroshima on August 28, 1981. He was accepted into the Japan Shogi Association's apprentice school at the rank of 6-kyū under the guidance of shogi professional  in September 1993, promoted to the rank of 1-dan in March 1996, and was awarded full professional status and the rank of 4-dan in April 2004 after winning the 34th 3-dan League (October 2003March 2004) with a record of 16 wins and 2 losses.

Shogi professional

Promotion history
Katagami's promotion history is as follows:
 6-kyū: 1993
 1-dan: 1996
 4-dan: April 1, 2004
 5-dan: October 10, 2006
 6-dan: May 12, 2009
 7-dan: July 18, 2018

JSA director
Katagami is a former member of the Japan Shogi Association's board of directors. He was first elected to a two-year term as a director at the association's 64th General Meeting in June 2013, and elevated to executive director at the 66th General Meeting in June 2015. Near the end of his second term, however, Katagami was one of three board members voted out of office by the JSA membership at an emergency meeting held in February 2017 for their involvement in the 29th Ryūō challenger controversy.

References

External links
ShogiHub: Katagami, Daisuke

daichan's opinion
daichanの小部屋
shogi-daichan.net 片上大輔（棋士）公認応援サイト

Japanese shogi players
Living people
Professional shogi players
University of Tokyo alumni
Professional shogi players from Hiroshima Prefecture
People from Hiroshima
1981 births